Oleksandr Valeriyovych Lazeykin (born 22 November 1982) is a Ukrainian sport shooter. Lazeykin represented Ukraine at the 2008 Summer Olympics in Beijing, where he competed in the men's 10 m air rifle, along with his teammate Artur Ayvazyan. He finished only in eleventh place by one point behind Austria's Thomas Farnik from the final attempt, for a total score of 594 targets.

References

External links
NBC Olympics Profile

1982 births
Living people
People from Bilohirsk Raion
Ukrainian male sport shooters
Olympic shooters of Ukraine
Shooters at the 2008 Summer Olympics
Sportspeople from Zaporizhzhia Oblast